Treaty of Kerden (Persian:عهدنامه گردان) was signed between Ottoman Empire and Afsharid Iran on 4 September 1746. It concluded the Ottoman-Persian War of 1743-1746.

Background 
During the last years of the Safavid dynasty in Iran, Ottomans were able to annex most of Caucasus and west Iran, due to hereditary strife, civil unrest and total chaos. Meanwhile, Afghans were able to annex a part of Khorasan. The shah had to appoint Nadir, an Iranian Afshar Turkoman warlord, as his commander in chief. Under Nadir’s brilliant commandship, Iran was able to regain most of her losses. After the victories, it was an easy matter for Nadir to seize the throne. In 1736, Nadir Shah founded the Afsharid dynasty (to be continued up to 1796.)
Nadir Shah was planning to found another great Persian empire, stretching from the Indus to the Bosphorus, like in ancient times. After reconquering former territories of Iran, he further tried to annex the eastern territories of the Ottoman Empire (East Anatolia and Iraq). He also proposed to reconcile the two sects (mazhab) of Islam. (Ottomans were of Sunni faith and most of Iranians were of Shia faith.) He planned to force Ottomans, then the champion of Sunnis, to accept Shia as a fifth legal sect of Islam.

The terms of the treaty 
The treaty was signed in Kerden (a location near Qazwin, Iran). The representatives were Hasan Ali Haji (Afsharid side) and Mustafa Nazif (Ottoman side).

The boundary line between the two countries was the same boundary line drawn roughly a century earlier according to the Treaty of Zuhab of 1639 (i.e., which included roughly the demarcation of the modern Turkey-Iran and Iraq-Iran border lines).
The Ottomans agreed to stop opposing the Afsharid dynasty as the rulers of Iran.
The Ottomans also agreed to allow the Iranian hajis (pilgrims) to Mecca (then under Ottoman control).
Exchange of consulates were permitted in both countries.
Iran abandoned to force the Ottomans to declare Shia as the fifth legal sect of Islam.
Both sides agreed to liberate the prisoners of war.

References and notes

Sources
 

1746 in Asia
1746 in law
1746 treaties
Ottoman–Persian Wars
Kerden
Kerden
1746 in the Ottoman Empire
1746 in Iran